Zende is a village in the Lobaye region in the Central African Republic southwest of the capital, Bangui.

Nearby towns and villages include Kinga (2.4 nm), Karawa (1.7 nm), Mbousi (8.3 nm), Gbokopeteme (4.9 nm) and Bobangui (8.6 nm).

References

Populated places in Lobaye